Thottappally Spillway is Kuttanad's drain-way out to the Arabian Sea. The Thottappally Spillway splits the Thottappally lake with the fresh water part to the east and saline Thottappally river mouth to the west merging with the Arabian Sea. Thottappally spillway is constructed to spill excess water coming over the Upper Kuttanad and Lower Kuttanad regions through Manimala River, Achancovil River and Pamba River. It is designed such that it could spill off 19,500 cubic meters of water per second, but after its construction it was found that it is able to spill 600 cubic meters of water per second. Reasons for this reduced flow rate are, strong sea breezes during rainy seasons resulting in a rise in sea level relative to the water level of Kuttanad, formation of sand bars on the western area of the spillway and the width of the leading canal is too narrow to carry this much water to the spillway.

History 
Spillway work forms part of the Kuttanad development scheme included in the first five year national plan. Spill way was inaugurated by Sri. Pattom Thanupillai on 5 December 1955.

References 

Arabian Sea
Spillways
Buildings and structures in Kerala